Daniel Hoelgaard (born 1 July 1993) is a Norwegian former cyclist, who last rode for UCI ProTeam . He was named in the startlist for the 2017 Vuelta a España.  Hoelgaard retired from competition at the end of the 2021 season. He is the brother of fellow racing cyclist Markus Hoelgaard.

Major results

2010
 1st  Road race, National Junior Road Championships
 9th GP Herning
2011
 1st Stage 2 Regio-Tour Junioren
 2nd Road race, National Junior Road Championships
 7th Road race, UCI Junior Road World Championships
2012
 1st Kernen Omloop Echt-Susteren
2014
 Tour de Bretagne
1st  Points classification
1st Stage 5
 Okolo Jižních Čech
1st  Points classification
1st Stages 1 & 4
 4th Overall Ronde de l'Oise
1st Stage 2
 5th Puchar Ministra Obrony Narodowej
 10th De Kustpijl
2015
 2nd Velothon Stockholm
 3rd Overall Tour de Bretagne
1st  Points classification
1st Stage 5
 3rd La Côte Picarde
 4th Overall Tour de Normandie
1st Stage 3
 6th Kernen Omloop Echt-Susteren
2016
 1st Stage 1 (TTT) La Méditerranéenne
 7th Bretagne Classic
2017
 7th Tour de Vendée
2018
 2nd Classic Loire-Atlantique
 6th Cholet-Pays de Loire

Grand Tour general classification results timeline

References

External links

1993 births
Living people
Sportspeople from Stavanger
Norwegian male cyclists